Ennis Municipal Airport  is  a city-owned public airport in Ennis, Ellis County, Texas, United States, located  west of the central business district. The airport has no IATA or ICAO designation.

Facilities 
 Runway 15/33: 3,999 x 50 ft. (1,219 x 15 m), Surface: Asphalt

For the 12-month period ending 4 April 2016, the airport had 3,720 aircraft operations, averaging 10 per day: 97% general aviation and 3% military. 12 aircraft were then based at this airport: 83% single-engine and 17% multi-engine.

Replacement plan 
Initial consideration for a replacement airport began in 2005 to address maintenance problems and a lack of space; the existing runway cannot be extended economically due to proximity to FM Road 1722 and Lake Clark, and it has chronic paving problems due to poor soil and drainage. An economic feasibility assessment was done for a new 490 ac (198 ha) airport—with a 5,000 ft (1,524 m) runway capable of handling business jets—adjacent to a new 300 ac (121 ha) business park. By September 2008, a provisional site was selected near the Texas Motorplex, with grants from the State Airport Fuel Fund (TxDOT) and the FAA to cover 90% of the cost, and the city the other 10%, with only the environmental assessment awaiting completion. However, the plans were shelved by early 2010 due to economic pressure and FAA funding cuts. The proposal has been revived as of late 2017.

Accidents and incidents 
 10 January 1998: An Aero Commander 500B, registration number N556BW, struck power lines and terrain during an attempted single-engine go-around; the pilot and copilot were killed, the aircraft was destroyed, and the single passenger (who was also a commercially rated pilot) was seriously injured. After departing from nearby Lancaster Municipal Airport, the right-hand engine lost power, and the pilots shut it down and initiated a precautionary landing on Runway 15 at Ennis Municipal. The rated passenger remarked that the approach "seemed textbook perfect," but the pilots initiated a go-around for unknown reasons. As the flying pilot raised the flaps and began raising the landing gear, the nose pitched up, and the "left wing started up in what [the passenger believed] to be a VMC roll." The craft clipped power lines and impacted the ground in a right-wing-low attitude, coming to rest inverted. The accident was attributed to the failure of the pilots to maintain minimum control speed (VMC) during go-around, various maintenance problems with the right-hand engine, excessive gross weight, an excessively forward center of gravity, and both pilots' lack of experience in the aircraft make and model.

References

External links 
  at Texas DOT Airport Directory

Airports in Texas
Airports in the Dallas–Fort Worth metroplex
Transportation in Ellis County, Texas